Chance Carter (born 15 September 2001) is a Canadian former professional soccer player who played as a midfielder for FC Edmonton.

Early life
Carter grew up in Edmonton, Alberta. He played youth soccer for Drillers Soccer Club and then FC Edmonton Academy.

Club career

Vancouver Whitecaps
In early 2017, Carter joined the academy program of Major League Soccer side Vancouver Whitecaps FC. In the 2016–17 USSDA season, he made eleven appearances for Vancouver's under-15/16 side, scoring one goal. The following year, he made 29 appearances in all competitions for the under-16/17 side, scoring five goals, and also made one appearance for the under-18/19 team.

In 2018–19, Carter joined the  under-18/19 ranks and made thirteen appearances. The following year, he scored one goal in eight appearances for the team.

FC Edmonton
On 10 March 2020, Carter returned to FC Edmonton, signing his first professional contract. He made his debut for Edmonton on August 15 against Forge FC. The club announced his return to the team for the 2021 Canadian Premier League season on November 10, 2020. However, before the 2021 season, he announced his retirement to pursue other career aspirations, as he was attending university for dentistry.

References

External links

2001 births
Living people
Association football midfielders
Canadian soccer players
Soccer players from Edmonton
FC Edmonton players
Canadian Premier League players